Pisagua may refer to:

Pisagua, Chile, which was Pisagua, Peru before 1884.
Bombardment of Pisagua, 1879
Pisagua internment camp, Pisagua, Chile
The Pisagua Case, human rights violations in Chile 
BAP Pisagua (SS-33), a Peruvian navy submarine
Pisagua (ship), a clipper ship